Andy McLaren (born 5 June 1973 in Glasgow) is a former Scottish professional footballer. He began his career in 1989 with Dundee United where he was for 10 years and was part of the team when they won the Scottish Cup in 1994. He had trouble with cannabis and cocaine and spent time in rehab before returning to football in June 2000. In 2009, to help others to avoid the pitfalls that he experienced, he established the A&M Training and Development organisation.

Career
McLaren, a winger, began his career in 1989 with Dundee United where he remained for 10 years, helping them win the Scottish Cup in 1994. He left Tannadice for English club Reading in 1999 and during his spell had a brief loan spell at Livingston. On returning to Reading, he tested positive for cannabis and cocaine and admitted to alcoholism.

After spending time in rehabilitation, he returned to football in June 2000 when he was signed for Kilmarnock by the then manager Bobby Williamson. During his time at Rugby Park, he won his only Scotland cap, a substitute appearance in a 1–1 draw against Poland in April 2001.

He left Kilmarnock in August 2003 after rejecting a new contract and returned to Dundee United. He played for one season at Dundee United team, before being loaned to Partick Thistle and Greenock Morton before joining Morton permanently in 2005. After a season at Cappielow, he joined Dundee in July 2006. In his side's defeat at Clyde on 16 December 2006, McLaren was sent off for aiming a blow at a Clyde player, before getting a second red after striking another opponent on the way off the pitch. Once into the dressing rooms he received his third red card for kicking a hole in the door of the referee's room. As a consequence of his actions, Dundee decided to release him from his contract on 20 December 2006.

In February 2007, McLaren signed for Ayr United on a part-time deal until the end of 2006–07, scoring on his début a month later. McLaren was released from Somerset Park in May 2008, and in August 2008 spent a few games on trial at Bathgate Thistle, before a short spell at Lesmahagow and a short trial at Pollok, whom he left on the back of yet another red card. McLaren joined Petershill in 2009.

On 12 May 2016, McLaren signed for Tynecastle F.C. as a player-coach.

Personal life
McLaren gave a positive drugs test in 2000 during his time at Reading and was immediately banned from football. After receiving treatment for drug addiction and alcoholism, McLaren returned to football with Kilmarnock, continuing to receive treatment upon returning to first club Dundee United in 2004. Upon signing for Morton permanently in 2005, McLaren admitted to then manager Jim McInally he had suffered from abuse as a child, which had led to his drug and alcohol problems. He later announced he had considered suicide, including crashing into a lorry at 80 mph.

McLaren's life is detailed in his autobiography, Tormented, where he chronicles his abuse as a child. As highlighted in his autobiography, Andy wanted to help young people avoid the pitfalls that have affected his life and career. In February 2009 Andy established an organisation – A&M Training now A&M Scotland (www.aandm.org.uk) through which he delivers presentations and talks to young people on his life both in and out of football. A&M Scotland also provides activities such as football coaching and organised games as a way of diverting young people away from involvement in gangs and violence and uses sport and groupwork to build confidence and self-esteem in young people. in December 2014 the charity was named The Guardian UK Small/Medium Charity of the Year.

Career statistics

Personal awards and achievements
Scottish Premier League Player of the Month: August 2000

References

External links

Living people
1973 births
Scottish footballers
Footballers from Glasgow
Scotland under-21 international footballers
Scotland international footballers
Scottish Premier League players
Scottish Football League players
Dundee United F.C. players
Reading F.C. players
Livingston F.C. players
Kilmarnock F.C. players
Partick Thistle F.C. players
Greenock Morton F.C. players
Dundee F.C. players
Ayr United F.C. players
Pollok F.C. players
Petershill F.C. players
Bathgate Thistle F.C. players
Scottish Junior Football Association players
Association football wingers